Andrés Febrés was 18th-century  Spanish Jesuit active in Colonial Chile. He is best known for his book 

In his writings he supported the incorporation of the lands of the independent Cunco and Huilliche, the Futahuillimapu, into the Spanish Empire. In 1767 Febrés made plans to establish a mission in Río Bueno south of Valdivia. This mission was however established in 1777 by Franciscans as the Jesuits had been expelled from the Americas in 1767.

References

Jesuits from Catalonia
Spanish philologists
Linguists from Spain
18th-century Spanish Jesuits
Jesuit historians and chroniclers
Spanish Roman Catholic missionaries
Jesuit missionaries in Chile
Missionary linguists
Linguists of indigenous languages of South America
Jesuits expelled from the Americas
1732 births
1790 deaths